Maurice Baring  (27 April 1874 – 14 December 1945) was an English man of letters, known as a dramatist, poet, novelist, translator and essayist, and also as a travel writer and war correspondent, with particular knowledge of Russia. During World War I, Baring served in the Intelligence Corps and Royal Air Force.

Life
Baring was the eighth child, and fifth son, of Edward Charles Baring, first Baron Revelstoke, of the Baring banking family, and his wife Louisa Emily Charlotte Bulteel, granddaughter of the second Earl Grey. Born in Mayfair, he was educated at Eton College and Trinity College, Cambridge. After an abortive start of a diplomatic career, he travelled widely, particularly in Russia, where he lived in 1905–06. He reported as an eye-witness of the Russo-Japanese War for the London Morning Post. On returning to London he lived at North Cottage, 6 North Street, Westminster.

At the start of World War I he joined the Royal Flying Corps, where he served as assistant to David Henderson and Hugh Trenchard in France. Throughout the war he corresponded with Lady Juliet Duff, the widow of Sir Robin Duff, 2nd Baronet of Vaynol, who was killed on 16 October 1914 near Oostnieuwekirke while serving with the 2nd Life Guards. These letters were later published under the title of Dear Animated Bust: Letters to Lady Juliet Duff. In 1918, Baring served as a staff officer in the Royal Air Force and was appointed Officer of the Order of the British Empire in the 1918 Birthday Honours. In 1925 Baring received an honorary commission as a wing commander in the Reserve of Air Force Officers. After his death, Trenchard wrote, "He was the most unselfish man I have ever met or am likely to meet. The Flying Corps owed to this man much more than they know or think."

As an author, Baring wrote poetical dramas earlier in his career (for instance The Black Prince and Other Poems, 1902), then a series of books on Russia (such as Landmarks in Russian Literature, 1910, and The Mainsprings of Russia, 1914). After the war he turned to full time writing and began to write novels. These included C (1924), Cat's Cradle (1925), The Coat Without Seams (1929), Robert Peckham (1930) and The Lonely Lady of Dulwich (1934). An autobiography, The Puppet Show of Memory, came out in 1922, focused on his childhood and youth. His last full-scale work was the anthology with commentary Have You Anything to Declare (1936). He suffered from chronic illness during the last years of his life; for his final 15 years he was debilitated by Parkinson's disease.

He was widely known socially, to some of the Cambridge Apostles, to The Coterie, and to the literary group associating with G. K. Chesterton and Hilaire Belloc in particular. He enjoyed close friendships with Dame Ethel Smyth (who produced a biography of him in 1938) and Enid Bagnold. He was staunch in his anti-intellectualism with respect to the arts, and a convinced practical joker.

Previously an agnostic, he converted to Roman Catholicism in 1909, "the only action in my life which I am quite certain I have never regretted." Speaking from personal experience, however, he once advised Belloc to "never, never, never talk theology or discuss the Church with those outside it. People simply do not understand what you are talking about and they merely (a) get angry and (b) come to the conclusion that one doesn't believe in the thing oneself and that one is simply doing it to annoy."

Legacy
Baring is remembered in verse in Belloc's Cautionary Verses:

Like many of the upper class
He liked the sound of broken glass*
* A line I stole with subtle daring
From Wing-Commander Maurice Baring

He once gave Virginia Woolf a copy of his book C. She was not impressed, writing in her diary: "Second-rate art i.e. C., by Maurice Baring. Within its limits, it is not second rate, or there is nothing markedly so, at first go off. The limits are the proof of its non-existence. He can only do one thing; himself to wit; charming, clean, modest, sensitive Englishman. Outside that radius and it does not carry far nor illumine much, all is—as-it-should be—light, sure, proportioned, affecting even; told in so well-bred a manner that nothing is exaggerated, all related, proportioned. I could read this for ever, I said. L. said one would soon be sick to death of it".

The character Horne Fisher, the protagonist of The Man Who Knew Too Much, a collection of detective stories by G. K. Chesterton, "is generally thought to be based on Chesterton's good friend, Maurice Baring". Although, while "Fisher fits Baring's physical description, he is a respected member of the upper class, and he seems to know everybody and everything", the similarity ends there, Chesterton scholar Dale Ahlquist notes: "By all accounts, the real Baring was a charming, affable gentleman who knew how to laugh and had no fear of making a fool of himself," while "Horne Fisher is distinctly lacking in both the charm and humour departments."

Works

The Black Prince and Other Poems (1903)
 With the Russians in Manchuria. (1905) London: Methuen.  OCLC 811786
Forget-me-Not and Lily of the Valley (1905) Humphreys
Sonnets and Short Poems (1906)
Thoughts on Art and Life (1906)
Russian Essays and Stories. (1908) London: Methuen.
Orpheus in Mayfair and Other Stories (1909) short stories
Dead Letters (1910) satirical collection
The Glass Mender and Other Stories (1910)
Landmarks in Russian Literature(1910) London: Methuen.
The Russian People (1911)
Letters from the Near East (1913)
Lost Diaries (1913) fictional extracts from diaries of notable people
The Mainsprings of Russia (1914)
Round the World in any Number of Days (1919)
Flying Corps Headquarters 1914-1918 (1920)
Passing By (1921) novel
The Puppet Show of Memory (1922) autobiography
Overlooked (1922) short story
Poems 1914–1919 (1923)
C (1924) novel
Punch and Judy and Other Essays (1924)
Half a Minute's Silence and Other Stories (1925)
Cat's Cradle (1925) novel
Daphne Adeane (1926) novel
Tinker's Leave (1927) novel
Comfortless Memory (1928) novel
The Coat Without Seam (1929) novel
Robert Peckham (1930) historical novel
In My End is My Beginning (1931) biographical novel about Mary Stuart
Friday's Business  (1932) novel
Lost Lectures (1932) imaginary lectures
Unreliable History (1934) omnibus collection of works
The Lonely Lady of Dulwich (1934) novella
Darby and Joan (1935) novel
Have You Anything to Declare? (1936) collection of notes and quotes
Collected Poems (1937) poetry
Maurice Baring: A Postscript by Laura Lovat with Some Letters and Verse (1947)
Maurice Baring Restored: Selections from His Work (1970) chosen and edited by Paul Horgan
Dear Animated Bust: Letters to Lady Juliet Duff, France 1915-1918 (1981)
Letters (2007) selected and edited by Jocelyn Hillgarth and Julian Jeffs
Baring also edited The Oxford Book Of Russian Verse published by Clarendon (1924)

References

Further reading
 Bleiler, Everett Franklin (1948). The Checklist of Fantastic Literature. Chicago: Shasta Publishers. OCLC 1113926; re-published in 1972,  The Checklist of Fantastic Literature: A Bibliography of Fantasy, Weird and Science Fiction Books Published in the English Language, Naperville, Illinois: FAX Collectors Editions.  OCLC 1438931
 Horgan, Paul (1970).  Maurice Baring Restored: Selections from His Work, London: Heinemann. ;  OCLC 113239
 Las Vergnas, Raymond (1938). Chesterton, Belloc, Baring, New York, Sheed & Ward.
 Letley, Emma (1991).  Maurice Baring: A Citizen of Europe London: Constable.  ;  OCLC 27147821.
 
 Smyth, Ethel. Maurice Baring (1938)

External links

Portraits of Maurice Baring in the National Portrait Gallery (London).
Maurice Baring Collection. General Collection. Beinecke Rare Book and Manuscript Library, Yale University.

Libraries
Maurice Baring Collection at the Harry Ransom Center
Maurice Baring Collection at Houghton Library
Maurice Baring Collection at the John J. Burns Library
Maurice Baring material at the UK National Archives

Electronic editions
 
 
 
 

1874 births
1945 deaths
20th-century British translators
20th-century English male writers
20th-century English novelists
20th-century essayists
Alumni of Trinity College, Cambridge
British Army personnel of World War I
British male dramatists and playwrights
British male essayists
Converts to Roman Catholicism from atheism or agnosticism
Deaths from Parkinson's disease
English Catholic poets
English dramatists and playwrights
English essayists
English male non-fiction writers
English male novelists
English male poets
English Roman Catholics
English translators
English travel writers
Intelligence Corps officers
Neurological disease deaths in Scotland
Officers of the Order of the British Empire
People educated at Eton College
People from Mayfair
Roman Catholic writers
Royal Air Force personnel of World War I
Royal Air Force wing commanders
Royal Flying Corps officers
War correspondents of the Balkan Wars
War correspondents of the Russo-Japanese War
Younger sons of barons
Maurice